Pogoń Prudnik, also known as shortly Pogoń, is a Polish football club based in Prudnik. The team's colors are blue and white.

The club was founded on 15 September 1945. In the seasons 1967/68, 1968/69, 1969/70, 1970/71 and 1978/79 it played in III liga (currently II liga).

Pogoń hosts its games at the Stadium on Kolejowa 7 Street in Prudnik.

2015/2016 squad

Notable players 
 Helmut Foreiter
 Mateusz Kamiński
 Henryk Majer

References

External links 
 Official website
 Pogoń Prudnik at the 90minut.pl website (Polish)

Sport in Prudnik
Association football clubs established in 1945
1945 establishments in Poland